Gravitational-wave astronomy is an emerging branch of observational astronomy which aims to use gravitational waves (minute distortions of spacetime predicted by Albert Einstein's theory of general relativity) to collect observational data about objects such as neutron stars and black holes, events such as supernovae, and processes including those of the  early universe shortly after the Big Bang.

Gravitational waves have a solid theoretical basis, founded upon the theory of relativity. They were first predicted by Einstein in 1916; although a specific consequence of general relativity, they are a common feature of all theories of gravity that obey special relativity. However, after 1916 there was a long debate whether the waves were actually physical, or artefacts of coordinate freedom in general relativity; this was not fully resolved until the 1950s.  Indirect observational evidence for their existence first came in the late 1980s, from the monitoring of the Hulse–Taylor binary pulsar (discovered 1974); the pulsar orbit was found to evolve exactly as would be expected for gravitational wave emission. Hulse and Taylor were awarded the 1993 Nobel Prize in Physics for this discovery.

On 11 February 2016 it was announced that the LIGO collaboration had directly observed gravitational waves for the first time in September 2015. The second observation of gravitational waves was made on 26 December 2015 and announced on 15 June 2016. Barry Barish, Kip Thorne and Rainer Weiss were awarded the 2017 Nobel Prize in Physics for leading this work.

Observations

Ordinary gravitational waves' frequencies are very low and much harder to detect, while higher frequencies occur in more dramatic events and thus have become the first to be observed.

In addition to a merger of black holes, a binary neutron star merger has been directly detected: a gamma-ray burst (GRB) was detected by the orbiting Fermi gamma-ray burst monitor on 2017 August 17 12:41:06 UTC, triggering an automated notice worldwide. Six minutes later a single detector at Hanford LIGO, a gravitational-wave observatory, registered a gravitational-wave candidate occurring 2 seconds before the gamma-ray burst. This set of observations is consistent with a binary neutron star merger, as evidenced by a multi-messenger transient event which was signalled by gravitational-wave,  and electromagnetic (gamma-ray burst, optical, and infrared)-spectrum sightings.

High frequency
In 2015, the LIGO project was the first to directly observe gravitational waves using laser interferometers. The LIGO detectors observed gravitational waves from the merger of two stellar-mass black holes, matching predictions of general relativity. These observations demonstrated the existence of binary stellar-mass black hole systems, and were the first direct detection of gravitational waves and the first observation of a binary black hole merger. This finding has been characterized as revolutionary to science, because of the verification of our ability to use gravitational-wave astronomy to progress in our search and exploration of dark matter and the big bang.

There are several current scientific collaborations for observing gravitational waves. There is a worldwide network of ground-based detectors, these are kilometre-scale laser interferometers including: the Laser Interferometer Gravitational-Wave Observatory (LIGO), a joint project between MIT, Caltech and the scientists of the LIGO Scientific Collaboration with detectors in Livingston, Louisiana and Hanford, Washington; Virgo, at the European Gravitational Observatory, Cascina, Italy; GEO600 in Sarstedt, Germany, and the Kamioka Gravitational Wave Detector (KAGRA), operated by the University of Tokyo in the Kamioka Observatory, Japan. LIGO and Virgo have both been upgraded to advanced configurations. Advanced LIGO began observations in 2015, detecting gravitational waves even though not having reached its design sensitivity yet.  The more advanced KAGRA started observation on February 25, 2020. GEO600 is currently operational, but its sensitivity makes it unlikely to make an observation; its primary purpose is to trial technology.

Low frequency 
An alternative means of observation is using pulsar timing arrays (PTAs). There are three consortia, the European Pulsar Timing Array (EPTA), the North American Nanohertz Observatory for Gravitational Waves (NANOGrav), and the Parkes Pulsar Timing Array (PPTA), which co-operate as the International Pulsar Timing Array. These use existing radio telescopes, but since they are sensitive to frequencies in the nanohertz range, many years of observation are needed to detect a signal and detector sensitivity improves gradually. Current bounds are approaching those expected for astrophysical sources.

Intermediate frequencies
Further in the future, there is the possibility of space-borne detectors. The European Space Agency has selected a gravitational-wave mission for its L3 mission, due to launch 2034, the current concept is the evolved Laser Interferometer Space Antenna (eLISA). Also in development is the Japanese Deci-hertz Interferometer Gravitational wave Observatory (DECIGO).

Scientific value
Astronomy has traditionally relied on electromagnetic radiation. Originating with the visible band, as technology advanced, it became possible to observe other parts of the electromagnetic spectrum, from radio to gamma rays. Each new frequency band gave a new perspective on the Universe and heralded new discoveries. During the 20th century, indirect and later direct measurements of high-energy, massive, particles provided an additional window into the cosmos. Late in the 20th century, the detection of solar neutrinos founded the field of neutrino astronomy, giving an insight into previously inaccessible phenomena, such as the inner workings of the Sun. The observation of gravitational waves provides a further means of making astrophysical observations.

Russell Hulse and Joseph Taylor were awarded the 1993 Nobel Prize in Physics for showing that the orbital decay of a pair of neutron stars, one of them a pulsar, fits general relativity's predictions of gravitational radiation. Subsequently, many other binary pulsars (including one double pulsar system) have been observed, all fitting gravitational-wave predictions. In 2017, the Nobel Prize in Physics was awarded to Rainer Weiss, Kip Thorne and Barry Barish for their role in the first detection of gravitational waves.

Gravitational waves provide complementary information to that provided by other means. By combining observations of a single event made using different means, it is possible to gain a more complete understanding of the source's properties. This is known as multi-messenger astronomy. Gravitational waves can also be used to observe systems that are invisible (or almost impossible to detect) by any other means. For example, they provide a unique method of measuring the properties of black holes.

Gravitational waves can be emitted by many systems, but, to produce detectable signals, the source must consist of extremely massive objects moving at a significant fraction of the speed of light. The main source is a binary of two compact objects. Example systems include:
 Compact binaries made up of two closely orbiting stellar-mass objects, such as white dwarfs, neutron stars or black holes. Wider binaries, which have lower orbital frequencies, are a source for detectors like LISA. Closer binaries produce a signal for ground-based detectors like LIGO. Ground-based detectors could potentially detect binaries containing an intermediate mass black hole of several hundred solar masses.
 Supermassive black hole binaries, consisting of two black holes with masses of 105–109 solar masses. Supermassive black holes are found at the centre of galaxies. When galaxies merge, it is expected that their central supermassive black holes merge too. These are potentially the loudest gravitational-wave signals. The most massive binaries are a source for PTAs. Less massive binaries (about a million solar masses) are a source for space-borne detectors like LISA.
 Extreme-mass-ratio systems of a stellar-mass compact object orbiting a supermassive black hole. These are sources for detectors like LISA. Systems with highly eccentric orbits produce a burst of gravitational radiation as they pass through the point of closest approach; systems with near-circular orbits, which are expected towards the end of the inspiral, emit continuously within LISA's frequency band. Extreme-mass-ratio inspirals can be observed over many orbits. This makes them excellent probes of the background spacetime geometry, allowing for precision tests of general relativity.

In addition to binaries, there are other potential sources:
 Supernovae generate high-frequency bursts of gravitational waves that could be detected with LIGO or Virgo.
 Rotating neutron stars are a source of continuous high-frequency waves if they possess axial asymmetry.
 Early universe processes, such as inflation or a phase transition.
 Cosmic strings could also emit gravitational radiation if they do exist. Discovery of these gravitational waves would confirm the existence of cosmic strings.

Gravitational waves interact only weakly with matter. This is what makes them difficult to detect. It also means that they can travel freely through the Universe, and are not absorbed or scattered like electromagnetic radiation. It is therefore possible to see to the center of dense systems, like the cores of supernovae or the Galactic Center. It is also possible to see further back in time than with electromagnetic radiation, as the early universe was opaque to light prior to recombination, but transparent to gravitational waves.

The ability of gravitational waves to move freely through matter also means that gravitational-wave detectors, unlike telescopes, are not pointed to observe a single field of view but observe the entire sky. Detectors are more sensitive in some directions than others, which is one reason why it is beneficial to have a network of detectors. Directionalization is also poor, due to the small number of detectors.

In cosmic inflation
Cosmic inflation, a hypothesized period when the universe rapidly expanded during the first 10−36 seconds after the Big Bang, would have given rise to gravitational waves; that would have left a characteristic imprint in the polarization of the CMB radiation.

It is possible to calculate the properties of the primordial gravitational waves from measurements of the patterns in the microwave radiation, and use those calculations to learn about the early universe.

Development

As a young area of research, gravitational-wave astronomy is still in development; however, there is consensus within the astrophysics community that this field will evolve to become an established component of 21st century multi-messenger astronomy.

Gravitational-wave observations complement observations in the electromagnetic spectrum. These waves also promise to yield information in ways not possible via detection and analysis of electromagnetic waves. Electromagnetic waves can be absorbed and re-radiated in ways that make extracting information about the source difficult. Gravitational waves, however, only interact weakly with matter, meaning that they are not scattered or absorbed. This should allow astronomers to view the center of a supernova, stellar nebulae, and even colliding galactic cores in new ways.

Ground-based detectors have yielded new information about the inspiral phase and mergers of binary systems of two stellar mass black holes, and merger of two neutron stars. They could also detect signals from core-collapse supernovae, and from periodic sources such as pulsars with small deformations. If there is truth to speculation about certain kinds of phase transitions or kink bursts from long cosmic strings in the very early universe (at cosmic times around 10−25 seconds), these could also be detectable. Space-based detectors like LISA should detect objects such as binaries consisting of two white dwarfs, and AM CVn stars (a white dwarf accreting matter from its binary partner, a low-mass helium star), and also observe the mergers of supermassive black holes and the inspiral of smaller objects (between one and a thousand solar masses) into such black holes. LISA should also be able to listen to the same kind of sources from the early universe as ground-based detectors, but at even lower frequencies and with greatly increased sensitivity.

Detecting emitted gravitational waves is a difficult endeavor. It involves ultra-stable high-quality lasers and detectors calibrated with a sensitivity of at least 2·10−22 Hz−1/2 as shown at the ground-based detector, GEO600. It has also been proposed that even from large astronomical events, such as supernova explosions, these waves are likely to degrade to vibrations as small as an atomic diameter.

See also

 Gravitational wave background
 Gravitational-wave observatory
 List of gravitational wave observations
 Matched filter#In gravitational-wave astronomy

References

Further reading

External links
 LIGO Scientific Collaboration
 AstroGravS: Astrophysical Gravitational-Wave Sources Archive
 Video (04:36) – Detecting a gravitational wave, Dennis Overbye, NYT (11 February 2016).
 Video (71:29) – Press Conference announcing discovery: "LIGO detects gravitational waves", National Science Foundation (11 February 2016).
 Gravitational Wave Astronomy

 
Gravity
General relativity
Observational astronomy
Astrophysics
Astronomical sub-disciplines